The Algoma Light or Algoma Pierhead Light is a lighthouse located near Algoma in Kewaunee County, Wisconsin.

The lighthouse was first established in 1893 as a set of range lights. The station was automated in 1973. It is listed as number 20975 in the USCG light lists.

History 
The lighthouse was first established in 1893 as a set of range lights. In 1895, a fifth-order lens replaced the original lantern; increasing the effective range of the light to 11 miles. In 1907, with the keeper's accommodations still unbuilt, the wooden tower was in a significant state of distress and the decision was made to replace the tower. It was rebuilt in 1908.

The Fresnel lens remained the source of illumination until June 5, 2019, when it was replaced with an LED light. The Fresnel lens was placed on display at the North Point Lighthouse museum in Milwaukee.

Keepers 
The Light has had several keepers throughout its long history even prior to the construction of the tower. Ole Hansen was the first to man the light from 1893 – 1895. Charles E. Young followed in 1895 and remained until 1899. The third keeper was Nelson Knudsen who manned it from 1899 to 1901. In 1901, Gustavus Umberham transferred to Algoma from the Cedar River Lighthouse; bringing his five children with him. Umberham drowned on February 3, 1913, during a boat trip with three acquaintances, he was swept overboard by a large wave. Eugene Kimball, a close friend of Umberham was transferred to the station in April 1913. Kimball was manned the light until 1923 when he was transferred. After Kimball left, Carl J. Graan manned the lighthouse from 1923 to 1944.

Images

References

Further reading

 Havighurst, Walter (1943) The Long Ships Passing: The Story of the Great Lakes, Macmillan Publishers.
 Oleszewski, Wes, Great Lakes Lighthouses, American and Canadian: A Comprehensive Directory/Guide to Great Lakes Lighthouses, (Gwinn, Michigan: Avery Color Studios, Inc., 1998) .
 
 Sapulski, Wayne S., (2001) Lighthouses of Lake Michigan: Past and Present (Paperback) (Fowlerville: Wilderness Adventure Books) ; .
 Wright, Larry and Wright, Patricia, Great Lakes Lighthouses Encyclopedia Hardback (Erin: Boston Mills Press, 2006) .

External links
Anderson, Kraig, Lighthouse friends article
Seeing the light

National Park Service Maritime Heritage Project, Inventory of Historic Light Stations - Wisconsin

Lighthouses completed in 1908
Lighthouses completed in 1932
Buildings and structures in Kewaunee County, Wisconsin
Lighthouses in Wisconsin
Tourist attractions in Kewaunee County, Wisconsin
1908 establishments in Wisconsin